SAP Converged Cloud is a private managed cloud developed and marketed by SAP.

It is a set of cloud computing services that offers managed private cloud, based on the OpenStack technology-based public cloud. It is used by SAP's organization for their own internal IT resources to create a mix of different cloud computing environments made up of the OpenStack services. 
It offers compute, storage, and platform services that are accessible to SAP.

History
In 2012, SAP promoted aspects of cloud computing. In October 2012, SAP announced a platform as a service called the SAP Cloud Platform.

In May 2013, a managed private cloud called the S/4HANA Enterprise Cloud service was announced.

SAP Converged Cloud was announced in January 2015. SAP Converged Cloud is managed under The Converged Cloud unit, an SAP business unit established in 2015 headed by Markus Riedinger as Unit manager.
The Converged Cloud BETA went live in May 2017, included OpenStack technology-based storage, compute network components, and shared new services made by SAP: Later, Designate (DNS as a Service) was added as well.
On June 7, 2017, SAP announced that the company is planning to invest over $1 billion in cloud over the next two years.

In 2020, SAP donated spare GPUs and CPUs from its cloud data center to Folding@Home to aid in their COVID-19 research efforts.

Cloud computing challenges

Moving between clouds

Business organizations that want to use cloud computing have a choice of using a private cloud, which is a cloud infrastructure run specifically for a single organization that it built itself or by a third-party; or a public cloud, whereby a service provider makes available applications, storage, and other resources to the general public. The decision of which to use is based on a number of factors, such as whether the company operates in a highly regulated sector, such as the pharmaceuticals industry that must comply with rules regarding the control and security of data, or if the business must bring services to market quickly, such as a web applications developer. The first would opt for a private cloud for security peace of mind, while the web developer would choose a public cloud offering. Most companies would operate a mixture of the two, also known as hybrid cloud delivery.

Employing a hybrid delivery cloud strategy lets organizations use different cloud delivery services for specific applications. For instance, a public cloud may be a more cost-effective service for the compute-intensive task of processing analytics, but the data would remain local, or private, to comply with regulations. Because a hybrid delivery strategy lets organizations run applications and services across different clouds, collocation, and data centers, an example benefit of such a delivery mechanism is that organizations can move an app from one geographic location to another in major storms.

There can be different types of hybrid clouds for specific tasks. The Infrastructure as a Service (IaaS) model can be a hybrid cloud in that it could use operating systems and virtualization technologies from both a public and private cloud infrastructure to provide cloud services. Other models that mix on-premises cloud with public cloud technologies include Platform as a Service (PaaS), which includes infrastructure services combined with development tools and middleware; and Software as a Service (SaaS), which is used to develop packaged software.

However, moving data in the cloud can be a difficult procedure.  In the case of Software as a Service (SaaS), it is difficult particularly if the incumbent cloud provider used proprietary software, or if it altered an open source application.

A way to mitigate cloud migration difficulties is to architect applications for the cloud that reduce or eliminate the dependencies between the cloud application stack and the capabilities of the cloud service provider. Another way is to select only generic and higher-level applications to move to the cloud in the first place. Another method is to select open standards for cloud computing.

A best practice for avoiding cloud migration problems is to use a management platform that can support applications in any environment a user organization is likely to use. This has been described as using a "best-of-breed" approach.

Converged Cloud characteristics and components

Converged infrastructure
SAP Converged Cloud follows the premise of Converged infrastructure: the integration of compute, storage, and networking components and technologies into self-provisioning pools of shared resources, and supported by IT services. One of the benefits of a data center based on converged infrastructure, including a converged infrastructure data center that delivers cloud services, is that manual tasks can be automated, thus reducing the time and cost to carry them out.

Open standards
SAP Converged Cloud is supporting the VMware hypervisors. It supports multiple operating systems (Microsoft, Red Hat, Ubuntu, etc.)
It supports a wide range of development environments. Being based on Openstack technology, means it is compatible with public cloud platforms based on OpenStack technology, such as RackSpace and Nebula.

SAP Converged Cloud Professional Services
SAP Converged Cloud consultants work with SAP's users to help them configure their best cloud approach. These users receive advice on how they can implement cloud in a consistent manner and how to get value from their cloud investment. Users also receive advice on how to manage the cloud.

Services
SAP Cloud Marketing – Delivers information on the possible uses for cloud services and identifies opportunities to begin implementing cloud.

Cloud products
 Compute is the service that can deliver a virtual server on demand. New virtual servers, or compute instances, can be brought online in seconds and can be fully customized to meet a variety of computing needs. It is built on OpenStack's open source operating environment.
 Object Storage 
 Content Delivery Network (CDN) is a webservice that delivers data from the Object Storage to users all around the world. Using an extensive global network of servers from Akamai Technologies, SAP's CDN routes content to local servers closest to the customers.
 Block Storage enables customers to store data from Compute instances for as long as needed. Block Storage is ideal for applications requiring frequent read/write access such as web applications.
 Load Balancers are a managed load balancing service that allow for the automatic distribution of incoming traffic across compute resources.
 DNS is an enterprise-grade domain name system featuring anycast routing.
 Monitoring, also known as MAIA, is a complementary dashboard which delivers fundamental compute and block storage metrics, providing visibility into resource utilization, application performance, and operational health.
 Platform as a Service (PaaS) and Software as a Service (SaaS) Special cloud-based web services (like Applications, Databases, Multimedia, etc.).

See also
 List of SAP products
 OpenStack

References

External links 

Cloud platforms
Cloud computing
Cloud infrastructure
Converged Cloud
2017 in computing